This is a list of feature films and pre 1910 short films produced or filmed in New Zealand, ordered by year of release.

Key

 * = Funded in part by the New Zealand Film Commission.
 † = Year given is date of principal photography rather than release.

Pre 1910

1910s

1920s

1930s

1940s

1950s

1960s

1970s

1980s

1990s

2000s

2010s

2020s

See also
Cinema of New Zealand

References

 Leonard Maltin's 2007 Movie Guide

Further reading
Dennis, Jonathan & Jan Bieringa, (1996) "Film in Aotearoa New Zealand", Wellington: Victoria University Press. (best source on topic) 

 
 
 
Films